Phasianella ventricosa, common name the swollen pheasant shell or common pheasant shell, is a species of sea snail, a marine gastropod mollusk in the family Phasianellidae.

Description
It is a 
medium weight shell, with rounded whorls. The surface is smooth and glossy. The basic coloration is brick-red with fawn or cream axial streaks and alternating brown and white spiral lines.

Distribution
This species is endemic to Australia, from New South Wales to Western Australia and Tasmania. It lives on kelp and under rocks on reefs at depths of about 10 m.

References

 Swainson, W. (1822) Appendix: Description of several new shells, and remarks on others, contained in the collection of the late Mrs. Bligh. In: A catalogue of the rare and valuable shells, which formed the celebrated collection of the late Mrs. Bligh. The sale of this collection ... 20 May, 1822. C. Dubois, London: appendix, pp. 1-20
 Grove, S. 2011. The Seashells of Tasmania: A Comprehensive Guide. Taroona, Australia: Taroona Publications. [vi], 81

External links
 Reeve, L. A. (1862). Monograph of the genus Phasianella. In: Conchologia Iconica, or, illustrations of the shells of molluscous animals, vol. 13, pls 1-6 and unpaginated text. L. Reeve & Co., London
 Mabille, J. (1888). De quelques coquilles nouvelles. Bulletin de la Société Philomathique de Paris. ser. 7, 12 (2): 73-82
 Philippi, R. A. (1853). Die Gattungen Phasianella und Bankivia. In: Küster, H. C.; Kobelt, W., Eds. Systematisches Conchylien-Cabinet von Martini und Chemnitz. Neu herausgegeben und vervollständigt. Zweiten Bandes fünfte bis achte Abtheilung. Nürnberg: Bauer & Raspe. 2(5): 1-52, pls 1-6
 Menke K.T. (1843). Molluscorum Novae Hollandiae specimen. Hannover: Libraria Aulica Hahniana. 46 pp
 Biolib
 Sea Shells of NSW
 
 Molluscs of Tasmania

Phasianellidae
Gastropods described in 1822